Pandit Jawaharlal Nehru Institute of Business Management is located in Ujjain, Madhya Pradesh. The institute was established in the year 1989 under Vikram University. The infrastructure includes features such as e-classes that enable the lecturers to implement knowledge through computerized form, library possessing over 20, 000 volumes of books, well equipped net labs, campus covering a wide area of 2 acres.

The programs are for working executives as well as for freshers, through case based interactive learning sessions by faculty members drawn from industries, institutes and universities. Students here specialize in Marketing, Systems, insurance, jute, banking, Human Resources, Finance or Project Management. All the courses are approved by All India Council of Technical Education.

Academics
The management programs offered are:

 Master of Business Administration (MBA)
 Master of Business Administration (Part-time)

References

External links
Vikram University website
 website
Freepressjournal.in

Business schools in Madhya Pradesh
Universities and colleges in Madhya Pradesh
Educational institutions established in 2008
2008 establishments in Madhya Pradesh
Vikram University
Buildings and structures in Ujjain
Monuments and memorials to Jawaharlal Nehru